Vasanth Kumar Ravi is an Indian health care executive and actor who predominantly works in Tamil cinema. He rose to prominence in Tamil cinema for his performance as a lead actor in his debut film Taramani for which he received the Best Debut Actor at the 10th Vijay Awards and in the Jio 65th South Filmfare Awards in 2018.

Career 
Vasanth did his Masters in Health Care Management in Manchester, United Kingdom before turning to acting. He received his first acting opportunity in 2013 through film director Ram, who is widely known for his films including Kattradhu Thamizh and Thanga Meengal. Vasanth Ravi agreed to sign up the project with director Ram for the film Taramani which started its production venture in 2013 but underwent production delays before its actual release in August 2017. His debut feature film Taramani received positive reviews and his performance in the film along with Andrea Jeremiah in the lead role lauded praises from the audience. His maiden scintillating performance for the breakthrough film, Taramani also helped him to earn the Best male actor on debut (in the lead role) at the 2017 Ananda Vikatan Cinema Awards. Vasanth was also awarded the Vijay Award for Best Debut Actor at the 2018 Vijay Awards.

At the 2018 65th Filmfare Awards South which was held on June 16, he was awarded the Best Debut Actor which was his second career award for the breakthrough film Taramani.

His second film was Rocky. It received immense critical acclaim, thought it was only a moderate box-office success.

Filmography

References

External links 
 

Living people
Medical doctors from Tamil Nadu
21st-century Indian medical doctors
21st-century Indian male actors
Male actors in Tamil cinema
Tamil male actors
Male actors from Chennai
Year of birth missing (living people)